Körslaget 2008/09 Was the second season of TV4's entertainment show Körslaget. It first aired on 26 December 2008.

Competitors
Hanna Hedlund With a choir from Bollnäs
Erik Segerstedt With a choir from Uddevalla
Magnus Carlsson With a choir from Borås
Robert Wells With a choir from Falkenberg
Nanne Grönvall With a choir from Stockholm
LaGaylia Frazier With a choir from Sundsvall
Timo Räisänen With a choir from Göteborg

Episode 1
Aired 26 December 2008
 Team Erik - Mercy (Duffy)
 Team Nanne - Delilah (Tom Jones)
 Team LaGaylia - September (Earth, Wind & Fire)
 Team Timo - Stanna hos mig (Kent)
 Team Hanna - I Don't Feel Like Dancin' (Scissor Sisters)
 Team Magnus - I Will Survive (Gloria Gaynor)
 Team Wells - Let Me Entertain You (Robbie Williams)

Episode 2
Aired 27 December 2008
 Team Wells - Highway To Hell (AC/DC)
 Team Hanna - As Good As New (ABBA)
 Team Erik - Glorious (Andreas Johnson)
 Team Timo - Da Doo Ron Ron (The Crystals)
 Team LaGaylia - I Wish (Stevie Wonder)
 Team Magnus - Blame It On The Boogie (Jackson 5)
 Team Nanne - I Can Jive (Jerry Williams)

Results

 Team Timo, Eliminated
 Team Erik

Episode 3
Aired 3 January 2009
 Team Magnus - Get the Party Started (Pink)
 Team LaGaylia - Kiss (Prince)
 Team Erik - Apologize (OneRepublic)
 Team Nanne - Black or White (Michael Jackson)
 Team Wells - Dead Ringer for Love (Meat Loaf featuring Cher)
 Team Hanna - Don't Stop Me Now (Queen)

Results

 Team LaGaylia, Eliminated
 Team Nanne

Episode 4
Aired 10 January 2009
 Team Erik - Jennie Let Me Love You (E.M.D)
 Team Nanne - Whole Lotta Shakin' Goin' On (Jerry Lee Lewis)
 Team Magnus - Kom hem (Barbados)
 Team Hanna - Gabriellas sång (Helen Sjöholm)
 Team Wells - Saturday Night's Alright (Elton John)

Results

 Team Nanne, Eliminated
 Team Hanna

Episode 5
Aired 17 January 2009

Round 1

 Team Hanna - So What (Pink)
 Team Wells - Heaven's on Fire (Kiss)
 Team Erik - Grace Kelly (Mika)
 Team Magnus - Daddy Cool (Boney M)

Round 2

 Team Hanna - Shake Your Tailfeather (Blues Brothers)
 Team Wells - Candyman (Christina Aguilera)
 Team Erik - Signed, Sealed, Delivered I'm Yours (Stevie Wonder)
 Team Magnus - La Dolce Vita (After Dark)

Results

 Team Wells, Eliminated
 Team Magnus

Episode 6
Aired 24 January 2009

Round 1

 Team Magnus - Kom Igen Lena (Håkan Hellström)
 Team Erik - Kärleken är evig (Lena Philipsson)
 Team Hanna - Efterfest (Magnus Uggla)

Round 2

 Team Magnus - Does Your Mother Know (ABBA)
 Team Erik - No Air (Jordin Sparks feat. Chris Brown)
 Team Hanna - I Got Life (Hair)

Results

 Team Magnus, Eliminated
 Team Hanna

Episode 7 - (Finale)
Aired 31 January 2009

Round 1 (Own choice)

 Team Erik - Vingar (Mikael Rickfors)
 Team Hanna - Genom Eld och Vatten (Sarek)

Round 2 (The viewers choice)

 Team Erik - Jennie Let Me Love You (E.M.D)
 Team Hanna - Gabriellas sång (Helen Sjöholm)

Round 3 (Shared Song)

 Team Erik - Nessun Dorma (Turandot)
 Team Hanna - Nessun Dorma (Turandot)

Winners: Team Hanna

Elimination chart

TV4 (Sweden) original programming
2008 Swedish television seasons
2009 Swedish television seasons